The men's canoe sprint K-2 200 metres competition at the 2016 Olympic Games in Rio de Janeiro took place between 17 and 18 August at Lagoa Stadium.

It was the last appearance of the men's K-2 200 metres. The men's C-1 200 metres and men's K-2 200 metres were replaced with women's C-1 200 metres and women's C-2 500 metres as part of the Olympics' move towards gender equality.

Format

The competition comprised heats, semifinals, and a final round.  Heat winners advanced to the "A" final, with all other boats getting a second chance in the semifinals.  The top three from each semifinal also advanced to the "A" final, and competed for medals.  A placing "B" final was held for the other semifinalists.

Schedule
All times are Brasilia Time (UTC-03:00)

Results

Heats
The best placed boat from each heat qualified for the finals, remainder went to the semifinals.

Heat 1

Heat 2

Semifinals
First three boats in each semifinal qualify for the "A" final, remainder go to the "B" final.

Semifinal 1

Semifinal 2

Finals

Final B

Final A

References

Canoeing at the 2016 Summer Olympics
Men's events at the 2016 Summer Olympics